De Bokkedoorns is a restaurant located in Overveen in the Netherlands. It is a fine dining restaurant that was awarded one Michelin stars in the period 1978–1990. It is awarded two stars since 1991, up to present.

In 2013, GaultMillau awarded them 17.0 points (out of 20).

Head chef is Menno Post. He took over the kitchen on 1 January 2013.

In 1991, his predecessor Lucas Rive, head chef since 1990, became the youngest (29 years old) head chef in The Netherlands ever to be awarded two Michelin stars. In 1983, Koos Zijlstra was head chef.

De Bokkedoorns is member of Alliance Gastronomique Néerlandaise.

Star history
- 1978-1990: one star
- 1991–present: two stars

See also
List of Michelin starred restaurants in the Netherlands

Sources and references 

Restaurants in Bloemendaal
Michelin Guide starred restaurants in the Netherlands